James King (born May 9, 1949) is an American hurdler.  In 1975 he won the Pan American Games in the 400 Hurdles.  He was a top level performer for many years also competing in the United States Olympic Trials in 1972, 1976, 1980, and 1984.

He was ranked in the Top 10 United States 400 meter hurdlers for ten consecutive years most of it during the Edwin Moses and Andre Phillips era.  He held the official World Masters Athletics World Record in the 400 hurdles for Men 40+  for over 20 years, until it was surpassed in 2012 by Danny McFarlane.   He also held the World Record for the M35 and M40 400 metres (without hurdles) for almost 15 years each.

King competed collegiately for San Diego Mesa College, then San Diego State University and has remained in the area, coaching at San Diego Mesa College, San Diego City College, Grossmont College and Cuyamaca College.  He is currently an assistant coach back at Mesa College.

References

1949 births
Living people
Track and field athletes from California
American male hurdlers
American masters athletes
Pan American Games track and field athletes for the United States
Pan American Games gold medalists for the United States
Pan American Games bronze medalists for the United States
Pan American Games medalists in athletics (track and field)
Athletes (track and field) at the 1975 Pan American Games
Athletes (track and field) at the 1983 Pan American Games
World record setters in athletics (track and field)
San Diego State Aztecs men's track and field athletes
Medalists at the 1975 Pan American Games
Medalists at the 1983 Pan American Games